Agat is a Russian male first name. While "Agat" is simply a Russification of certain Western European names (all of which derive from the Greek word agathos, which means good, kind), it was also one of the newly created names documented in the 1920s and 1930s, given after agate, a semi-precious stone.

References

Notes

Sources
[1] А. В. Суперанская (A. V. Superanskaya). "Современный словарь личных имён: Сравнение. Происхождение. Написание" (Modern Dictionary of First Names: Comparison. Origins. Spelling). Айрис-пресс. Москва, 2005. 
[2] А. В. Суперанская (A. V. Superanskaya). "Словарь русских имён" (Dictionary of Russian Names). Издательство Эксмо. Москва, 2005. 

Masculine given names
Russian masculine given names
